Black Jack is a 1927 American silent Western film directed by Orville O. Dull and written by Harold Shumate. The film stars Buck Jones, Barbara Bennett, Theodore Lorch, George Berrell, Harry Cording and William Caress. The film was released on September 25, 1927, by Fox Film Corporation.

Cast
 Buck Jones as Phil Dolan
 Barbara Bennett as Nancy Blake
 Theodore Lorch as Sam Vonner
 George Berrell as Judge
 Harry Cording as Haskins
 William Caress as First Deputy
 Buck Moulton as Second Deputy
 Murdock MacQuarrie as Holbrook
 Frank Lanning as Kentuck
 Mark Hamilton as Slim
 Sam Allen as Ed Holbrook

Preservation status
 The film is currently a lost film.

References

External links 
 
 

1927 films
American silent feature films
Fox Film films
Lost Western (genre) films
1927 Western (genre) films
American black-and-white films
Lost American films
1927 lost films
Silent American Western (genre) films
1920s American films
1920s English-language films